Manoel Henrique Pereira (c. 1895 in Santo Amaro, Bahia – c. 1924 in Santo Amaro, Bahia), better known as Besouro Mangangá was a capoeirista from Bahia who at the beginning of the 20th century became a strong promoter of capoeira in Bahia. Its fame reached the national level from the 1930s and, with the expansion of capoeira to other continents, it became international.

Biography
Besouro Mangangá was the son of Maria José and João Matos Pereira, born in 1895, and was murdered in the Maracangalha camp, a place that was immortalized by the lyrics of Dorival Caymmi, in the Santa Casa de Misericórdia of Santo Amaro where he died in 1924. He was a native of the Bahian recôncavo and lived in that region, during a period when the sugarcane fields flourished in Santo Amaro , they played an important role in the productive scenario, through the sloops along the subaé river they took the goods that went to and arrived at the pier in Salvador.

Manoel Henrique, who, from an early age, learned the secrets of capoeira from Mestre Alípio in Trapiche de Baixo, was baptized as Besouro Mangangá because of the belief of many who said that when he got into some package and the number of enemies was too great, it was impossible to beat them, so he turned into a beetle and went flying. Several legends arose around Besouro to justify his deeds, the main one attributes to him the “closed body” and that bullets and daggers could not hurt him. Due to his supposed powers, the Beetle Mangangá became a mythological character for capoeira practitioners, having their identity related to bullies, cappadocians, wobbly and rascals.

It is speculated that he did not like the police and that he would have practiced several confrontations with the police forces, sometimes taking advantage of the clashes, however, according to Antonio Liberac Cardoso Simões Pires: “His practices cannot be associated with banditry, because Besouro has always characterized himself as a worker throughout his life, never being arrested for theft, theft or ordinary criminal activity. His arrests were related to actions against the police , especially while he was in the army ”. Some historical documentation records the confrontations between Besouro Mangangá and the police , such as what happened in 1918, in which Besouro would have gone to a police station in the neighborhood of São Caetano , in Salvador , to recover a berimbau that belonged to his group. With the agent's refusal to return the seized object, Besouro went on the attack with the help of some companions. They were unable to recover the desired berimbau, as they were beaten by the police, who received help from a group of local residents:

In popular culture
A film adaptation of the story of Besouro, directed by João Daniel Tikhomiroff, premiered in Brazil on October 30, 2009. Besouro was played by Ailton Carmo, and the fight choreography was handled by Huan-Chiu Ku, choreographer for the fight scenes in Kill Bill.

References

1890s births
1924 deaths
Brazilian capoeira practitioners
People from Bahia